This is a list of Spanish football transfers for the winter sale prior to the 2022–23 season of La Liga and Segunda División. Only moves from La Liga and Segunda División are listed.

La Liga

Almería

In

Out

Athletic Bilbao

In

Out

Atlético Madrid

In

Out

Barcelona

In

Out

Betis

In

Out

Cádiz

In

Out

Celta Vigo

In

Out

Elche

In

Out

Espanyol

In

Out

Getafe

In

Out

Girona

In

Out

Mallorca

In

Out

Osasuna

In

Out

Rayo Vallecano

In

Out

Real Madrid

In

Out

Real Sociedad

In

Out

Sevilla

In

Out

Valencia

In

Out

Valladolid

In

Out

Villarreal

In

Out

Segunda División

Alavés

In

Out

Albacete

In

Out

Andorra

In

Out

Burgos

In

Out

Cartagena

In

Out

Eibar

In

Out

Granada

In

Out

Huesca

In

Out

Ibiza

In

Out

Las Palmas

In

Out

Leganés

In

Out

Levante

In

Out

Lugo

In

Out

Málaga

In

Out

Mirandés

In

Out

Oviedo

In

Out

Ponferradina

In

Out

Racing Santander

In

Out

Sporting Gijón

In

Out

Tenerife

In

Out

Villarreal B

In

Out

Zaragoza

In

Out

References

Transfers
Spain
2022-23